Breeny More Stone Circle is an axial stone circle and National Monument located in County Cork, Ireland.

Location

History

Boulder burials of this type are believed to date from the middle Bronze Age, i.e. 1500–1000 BC. The toponym is from the Irish brúine móra, "great dwellings of the fairies."

Description

This is a stone circle with four boulder burials. It has a southeast-northwest axis, facing the rising sun.

A "boulder burial" is a single large boulder sitting on three or four support stones; the term was coined by Seán Ó Nualláin in the 1970s. They are generally found in the southwest, and associated with standing stones and stone circles; some dispute that there were ever burial sites, as no human remains have ever been recovered.

References

National Monuments in County Cork
Megalithic monuments in Ireland
2nd-millennium BC establishments